Ripper Street is a BBC fictional drama based in Whitechapel following on from the infamous murders of Jack the Ripper. The first episode was broadcast on 30 December 2012. A second series was confirmed in January 2013, with the first episode being broadcast on 28 October 2013. The third series was produced by Amazon Prime Instant Video and uploaded weekly onto the Amazon UK site from November 2014. A fourth series, again produced by Amazon Prime Instant Video, began airing weekly on the service, beginning 15 January 2016. This series was originally expected to consist of eight episodes, but ended up consisting of seven, including a feature-length premiere of 130 minutes that was split into two episodes for television broadcast. The concluding fifth series was released in full on Amazon Prime UK on 12 October 2016. It includes six episodes featuring a runtime of 60 to 75 minutes.

Series overview

Episodes

Series 1 (2012–13)
The first series is set in 1889.

Series 2 (2013)
The second series is set in 1890.

Series 3 (2014)
The third series is set in 1894.

Series 4 (2016)
The fourth series is set in 1897.

Series 5 (2016)
The fifth and final series directly continues the events of series 4.

References

Lists of British crime television series episodes
Lists of British period drama television series episodes
Fiction set in 1889
Fiction set in 1890
Fiction set in 1894
Fiction set in 1897